Sociedad Deportiva Cultural Galicia de Mugardos is a football team based in Mugardos in the autonomous community of Galicia. Founded in 1953, it plays in the Tercera División - Group 1. Its stadium is A Pedreira with a capacity of 1,500 spectators.

The club also acts as a reserve team for Racing de Ferrol since 2013.

Season to season

1 season in Tercera División

External links
Official Website
Futbolme.com profile

Football clubs in Galicia (Spain)
Divisiones Regionales de Fútbol clubs
Association football clubs established in 1953
1953 establishments in Spain